Manonmaniyam P. Sundaranar (4 April 1855 – 26 April 1897) was an Indian scholar, noted for the famous Tamil drama Manonmaniyam. as well as the state song of Tamil Nadu Tamil Thai Valthu.

Career

Sundaram showed his respect for Harvey, a Scottish Professor of Philosophy and English at The Maharaja's College, by dedicating his drama Manonmaniyam to him, and naming his farmhouse after him. Together they wrote the book, Some Early Sovereigns of Travancore.

The MDT Hindu College, Tirunelveli, of which he was the first Principal, describes his works as follows:

He established Saiva Prakasha Sabha at Trivandram in 1885. He taught Swami Vivekananda about the Saiva Sidhantham. In 1885, he published Chathira Saugiragam, commonly known as Nootrogai Villakkam. He wrote and published his masterpiece Manonmaniam in 1891.  In the same year, he became a member Fellow of Madras University (FMU). In 1897, Some Early Sovereigns of Travancore was published and he became a Member of Royal Asiatic Society (MRAS).

Death
He died of diabetes on 26 April 1897, at age 42. His son P. S. Nataraja Pillai served as Minister of Finance for Travancore-Cochin state from 1954–56 and was also a member of Constituent Assembly of India. He was elected to state legislative assembly of Kerala and to the Indian Parliament as a Lok Sabha member. He was politically associated with the Indian National Congress and Praja Socialist Party of India.

Legacy

Manonmaniam Sundaranar University was named after him.

The 1942 cinema adaptation Manonmani, is considered a classic film.

Works
Nūṟṟokai viḷakkam (நூற்றொகை விளக்கம்) (Tamil,1888)
Maṉōṉmaṇīyam (மனோன்மணீயம்) (Drama, 1891)

Tamiḻttāy vāḻttu (தமிழ்த்தாய் வாழ்த்து)

See also
Tamil Thai

References

External links
Dr. Kanam Sankara Pillai, Prof. Manonmaneeyam Sundaram Pillai MA (1855-1897)
Manonmaniyam (Project Madurai)

Tamil writers
Tamil-language writers
Tamil dramatists and playwrights
1897 deaths
1855 births
19th-century Indian dramatists and playwrights
Indian male dramatists and playwrights
Writers from Alappuzha
19th-century Indian male writers
Dramatists and playwrights from Kerala